This is a list of notable people from, or who spent considerable time residing in, Vancouver, British Columbia, Canada.

A
 Alison Acheson, writer
 Sean Anthony, basketball player
 Fardaws Aimaq, basketball player
 Daniel Adair, musician
 Bryan Adams, singer
 Robert Campbell Aitken, electrical engineer
 Vikky Alexander, artist
 Glenn Anderson, NHL hockey player
 Pamela Anderson, actress
 Omer Arbel, multidisciplinary artist and designer, co-founder of Bocci
 Arteezy, professional Dota 2 player

B
 Neeru Bajwa, actress
 Peter Bakonyi (1933–1997), Hungarian-born Canadian Olympic fencer
 Fairuza Balk, actress
 Ashleigh Ball, voice actress known for her lead role on My Little Pony: Friendship Is Magic and lead singer of Hey Ocean!
 Joan Balzar, painter
 James Barber (1923–2007), cookbook author, aka "The Urban Peasant"
 bbno$, recording artist
 AC Bonifacio, dancer
 Barry Beck, hockey player
 Gil Bellows, actor
Vicki Berner (1945–2017), tennis player
 Ray Bethell (1928-2008), master multiple kite flier
 Jean-Luc Bilodeau, actor
 Linwood Boomer, actor and television producer and writer
 Eddy Boudel Tan, writer
 Sage Brocklebank, actor
 Troy Brouwer, NHL hockey player
 Rod Bruno, musician
 Karin Bubaš, artist
 Hy Buller (1926–1968), All Star NHL ice hockey player

C
 Alexander Calvert, actor
 Kim Campbell, former Canadian Prime Minister
 Paul Campbell, actor
 Siobhan Carroll, professor, scholar and writer
 Anna Cathcart, actress
 Eliana Cuevas,  jazz Latin singer
 Erin Cebula, TV personality
 Erica Cerra, actress
 Sarah Chalke, actress
 Alina Chan, biologist
 Angela Chang, Mandopop singer
 Peter Chao, comedian
 Osric Chau, actor
 Edison Chen, Hong Kong entertainer
 Ying Chen, Francophone author
 Fred Cheng, Hong Kong actor/musician
 Joyce Cheng, actress
 Kevin Cherkas, chef
 Kayi Cheung, actress, Miss Hong Kong 2007
 Charlene Choi, actress and singer
 Edward (Woo-Shik) Choi, actor
 Tommy Chong, actor, comedian, musician
 Hayden Christensen, actor
 Frances Chung, ballet dancer
 Linda Chung, actress/musician
 Brandon Clarke, current NBA player for the Memphis Grizzlies
 Christy Clark, provincial politician and former Premier of British Columbia
 Jessica Leigh Clark-Bojin, artist and chef
 Meredith Coloma, luthier and musician
 Wayde Compton, author
 Torrance Coombs, actor
 Douglas Coupland, author
 Christian Covington, National Football League player
 Michelle Creber, actress, singer, songwriter, dancer 
 Amanda Crew, actress
 Roger Cross, actor
 Seán Cummings, actor and playwright

D
 Mackenzie Davis, actress
 Brian Day, doctor
 Yvonne De Carlo (1922-2007), actress, dancer, singer of Hollywood's Golden Age
 Haley de Jong, gymnast for the Georgia Gymdogs
 Jay DeMerit, MLS, World Cup soccer player
 Katherine DeMille (1911-1995), actress of Hollywood's Golden Age
 Dana Devine, blood transfusion researcher
 Ranj Dhaliwal, writer
 Michele Di Menna (born 1980), artist
 Lexa Doig, actress
 James Doohan (1920–2005), actor ("Lt. Cmdr. Montgomery Scott "Scotty" from television show Star Trek)
 Audrey Capel Doray, artist
 Stan Douglas, artist
 Brian Drummond, voice actor
 Terry Dunfield, soccer coach, commentator and former player
 Jacqueline Dupuis, Executive Director of Vancouver International Film Festival

E
 Aileen Eaton, boxing promoter
 Aryana Engineer, actress
 Daniella Evangelista, actress, model
 Arthur Erickson, architect, urban planner 
 Robin Esrock, travel writer 
 Elise Estrada, singer-songwriter, actress
 El Phantasmo, Professional Wrestler

F
 Bruce Fairbairn, musician, producer
 Jessie Farrell, singer
 Wally Fawkes, (1924–2023), jazz clarinetist and satirical cartoonist
 Gordon Fee, New Testament scholar
 John Ferguson Sr., professional hockey player
 Jodelle Ferland, actress
 Nathan Fielder, comedian
 Rod Filbrandt, cartoonist
 Nigel Findley, fantasy, science fiction, and RPG author
 Noel Fisher, actor
Isaiah Faber, rapper, songwriter, and record producer
 Ben Fisk, soccer player
 Brendan Fletcher, actor
 Nathan Fong, chef 
 William Wasbrough Foster, mountaineer, soldier, politician, business executive, and chief constable of Vancouver
 Daniel Francis, writer and historian
 Jeff Francis, Major League Baseball player
 Leonard Frank, photographer
 Rhys Fulber, musician, producer
 Freddy Fuller, boxing champion
 Nolan Gerard Funk, actor

G
 Emmanuelle Schick Garcia, film director and writer
 Austin Gary, author, songwriter
 C. E. Gatchalian, playwright
 Dan George, actor and chief
 William Gibson, writer
 Shelley Gillen, producer, screenwriter and songwriter
 Greg Girard, photographer
 Evan Goldberg, writer, producer and director
 Matthew Good, singer/songwriter
 Rodney Graham, artist
 Jennifer Granholm, former governor of U.S. State of Michigan (2003-11), current US Secretary of Energy under President Biden (2021-present)
 Nancy Greene Raine, Olympic champion and Canadian senator
 Grimes, singer, songwriter, director, musician, actress
 Aaron Guiel, Major League Baseball player
 Trevor Guthrie, singer

H
 Jansen Harkins, NHL player for the St. Louis Blues
 Rich Harden, Major League Baseball player
 Jillian Harris, ABC's 5th Bachelorette
 Laura Harris, actress
 Chris Haslam, professional skateboarder
 Joel Haywood, basketball player
 Gregory Henriquez, architect
 Meghan Heffern, actress
 Ed Hill, stand-up comedian
 Brent Hodge, film director and CEO of Hodgee Films
 Bert Hoffmeister, commander of the 5th Canadian Division in the Second World War, then president of MacMillan Bloedel
 Jacob Hoggard, lead singer of the band Hedley
 Clive Holden, poet, film director and visual artist
 Antony Holland, actor
 Bob Houbregs, NBA player for the Milwaukee Hawks, Baltimore Bullets, Boston Celtics, and the Fort Wayne Pistons; general manager of the Seattle SuperSonics; member of the Naismith Memorial Basketball Hall of Fame
 Harrison Houde, composer, actor
Barbara Howard, sprinter
 Elva Hsiao, Mandopop singer

I
 Robert Ito, former actor
 Daniel Ingram, musician
 John Ireland, actor
 Britt Irvin, actress, musician and voice-over artist
 Katharine Isabelle, actress

J
 Jason Wu, fashion designer
 Joshua Jackson, actor
 Liam James, actor
 Jazzy B, actor, singer
 Sarah Jeffery, actress, dancer, singer
 Jensen Ackles, actor, singer
 Carly Rae Jepsen, singer
 Avan Jogia, actor
 Ryan Johansen, ice hockey player
 Alexz Johnson, actress, singer
 Vera Johnson, singer
 Manny Jacinto, actor, comedian
 Christopher Judge, actor
 Jenna Talackova, trans woman model, actress and television personality

K
 Evander Kane, National Hockey League player
 Paul Kariya, National Hockey League player
 Earl Keeley, football player
 Alexander Kerfoot, National Hockey League player
 Conor Kerr, author
 Cevin Key, musician
 Margot Kidder, late actress
 Kevin Chong, novelist
 Kristin Kreuk, actress
 Sean Michael Kyer, actor

L
 Angela Lee, mixed martial arts
 Christian Lee, mixed martial arts
 David Lam, politician 
 Tyler Labine, actor
 Evelyn Lau, poet and novelist
 Maggie Lawson, actress
 Cory Lee, singer
 Mark Lee, singer, songwriter and member of South Korean boy group NCT
 Bill Leeb, musician, singer
 Lily Alice Lefevre, poet
 Bob Lenarduzzi, soccer player
 Sherwood Lett, soldier, lawyer, chancellor of UBC
 Jeff L. Lieberman, film director, writer and producer
 Shin Lim, close-up magician
 Trevor Linden, NHL hockey player
 Bernice Liu, actress
 Mary Livingstone (formerly Sadie Marks), actress; wife of Jack Benny
 Quinn Lord, actor
 Rochelle Low, field hockey player
 Crystal Lowe, actress
 Jessica Lowndes, actress
 Jessica Lucas, actress
 Milan Lucic, NHL player
 Alexander Ludwig, actor

M
 Norma MacMillan, voice actress
 Brandon Jay McLaren, actor
 Tegan Moss, actress
 Trystan Magnuson, Major League Baseball player
 Karen Diane Magnussen, figure skater
 Dan Mangan, musician
 Charles Marega, sculptor
 Scott Mathieson, Major League Baseball player
 Terry McBride, CEO and founder, Nettwerk Music Group
 Shane McConkey, professional freestyle skier  
 Dean McFadden, Commander of the Royal Canadian Navy
Ashleigh McIvor, Olympic champion skier
Leah McHenry, musician and music educator
 Dave McKay, Major League Baseball player
 Cody McKay, Major League Baseball player
Sarah McLachlan, singer-songwriter
 Chris McNally, Canadian actor
 Andrew McNee, Canadian actor
 Mercedes McNab, actress
 John H. Meier, financier and former business adviser to Howard Hughes
 Charles Merritt, winner of the Victoria Cross
 Shay Mitchell, actress
 Wentworth Miller, actor
 Colin Mochrie, comedian
 Moka Only, rapper, musician, member of rap group Swollen Members
 Kevin Moon, vocalist with Korean group The Boyz
 Cory Monteith, actor
 Greg Moore, racing driver
 James Moore, politician and senior Federal cabinet minister
 Justin Morneau, Major League Baseball player
 Carrie-Anne Moss, actress
 Jane Munro, poet
 Michelle Mylett, actress

N
 Ira B. Nadel, biographer and literary critic
 Nardwuar the Human Serviette, radio host and musician
 Steve Nash, NBA player
 Cam Neely, NHL player
 Kliph Nesteroff, writer, broadcaster
 Alisha Newton, actress
 Kevin Nicholson, Major League Baseball player
 Mike Nickeas, Major League Baseball player
 Mayko Nguyen, actress
 Ryan Nugent-Hopkins, NHL player

O
 Brenna O'Brien, actress
 Victor Odlum, journalist, soldier, and diplomat
 Nivek Ogre, singer, musician
 Sandra Oh, actress
 Pat Onstad, soccer player

P
 J. I. Packer, Anglican theologian
 Fred Page, Hockey Hall of Fame inductee
 Frank Palmer, businessman
 Grace Park, actress
 Jim Pattison, entrepreneur
 Kit Pearson, children's writer
 Missy Peregrym, actress
 Emily Perkins, actress
 Kimberly Phillips, educator and curator
 James Picard, artist
 Mandy Playdon, actress
 Carly Pope, actress
 Powfu, singer-songwriter
 Daniel Powter, singer
 Carey Price, NHL hockey goalie
 Jason Priestley, actor, director, producer
 Kirsten Prout, actress

Q
Wanting Qu, singer-songwriter
Juda Hirsch Quastel, biochemist, died in Vancouver

R
 Josh Ramsay, lead singer of band Marianas Trench
 Rascalz, hip hop group
 Michael Rasmussen, NHL player for the Detroit Red Wings
 Ryan Reynolds, actor
 Emily Bett Rickards, actress
 Morgan Rielly, NHL player
 Ryan Robbins, actor
 Rachel Roberts, actress, fashion model
 Claude C. Robinson, ice hockey executive and inductee into the Hockey Hall of Fame
 Spider Robinson, author
 Wayne Robson, actor
 Coco Rocha, fashion model
 James Roday, actor
 Evan Roderick, actor and former ice hockey player
 Seth Rogen, actor, writer, and comedian
 Teryl Rothery, television anchor, actress
 Melissa Roxburgh, actress

S
 Mehdi Sadaghdar, YouTuber, comedian
 Joe Sakic, NHL player ("Burnaby Joe")
 Eliza Sam, Hong Kong actress
 Shaiju Mathew, author, filmmaker
 Devon Sawa, actor
 Linus Sebastian, YouTuber, presenter, producer, writer
 Louise Schatz, Canadian-born Israeli artist and designer
 Conrad Schmidt, activist
 Sophie Schmidt, member of Canadian Women's National soccer team 
 Drew Scott, television personality
 Jonathan Scott, television personality
 Brandon Segal, NHL player
 Michael Shanks, actor
 Kathryn Shaw, artistic director
 Stephen Lea Sheppard, actor, writer
 Hide Hyodo Shimizu, Japanese-Canadian educator and activist, member of the Order of Canada
 Lydia Shum Din-ha, elder sister of Alfred Sung; Hong Kong actress
 Christine Sinclair, captain of Canadian Women's National soccer team
 Robert Sing, Canadian footballer
 Nelson Skalbania, entrepreneur
 Stephen Smart, former journalist
 Bill Smith, soccer player
 Colleen Smith, All-American Girls Professional Baseball League player
 Gregory Smith, actor
 Trevor Smith, NHL player
 Cobie Smulders, actress
 Heather Spears, poet, artist, novelist
 John G. Stackhouse Jr., writer and professor of religion
 Rita Steblin, musicologist
 Kennedy Stewart academic and Mayor of Vancouver (2018–present)
 Dorothy Stratten, actress, model
 Jewel Staite, actress
 Arran Stephens, entrepreneur, writer
 Ryan Stiles, comedian, actor
 Sean Stubbs, musician
 Billy Suede, professional wrestler
 David Suzuki, environmentalist, scientist, broadcaster
 R. J. Swindle, Major League Baseball player

T
 Amanda Tapping, actress
 Ari Taub (born 1971), Olympic Greco-Roman wrestler
 Reece Thompson, actor
 Brent Titcomb, actor/singer, member of the Canadian band 3's a Crowd
 Alex To, Mandopop singer
 Eckhart Tolle, spiritual teacher
 Devin Townsend, singer, musician
 Jacob Tremblay, child actor
 Margaret Trudeau (now Margaret Trudeau Kemper), author; former wife of Prime Minister Pierre Trudeau and mother of Justin Trudeau
 Nicholas Tse, Cantopop singer
 John Turner, former Prime Minister

V
 Emmanuelle Vaugier, actress
Graham Verchere, actor
 Adrien Van Viersen, storyboard artist

W
 Andrew Wilkinson, physician, lawyer and politician
 Larry Walker, Major League Baseball player
 Jeff Wall, artist
 Ian Wallace, artist
 Brian Wong, founder of Kiip
 Nolan Watson, entrepreneur and philanthropist
 Daniel Wesley, musician
 Martyn S. Williams  A mountain and wilderness guide who is the first person in the world to lead expeditions to the three extremes, South Pole (1989) North Pole (1992) and Everest (1991).
 Chip Wilson, businessman and founder of Lululemon Athletica
 Finn Wolfhard, actor
 Kris Wu, actor and former member of South Korean-Chinese group EXO
 Charles Wilkinson, filmmaker and author
Byron Wong, musician

Y
 Benny Yau, television presenter, singer
 Françoise Yip, actress
 Brandon Yip, ice hockey player
 Kelly Yu, singer

Z
Alex Zahara, actor

See also

References

 
Vancouver
People
Van